Herbert Crossley (5 May 1901 – 15 November 1921) was a heavyweight boxing contender against Gene Tunney on 5 September 1921, shortly after arriving in the United States from England.  Crossley died from pneumonia and sepsis on 15 November 1921 at the age of 20.

References

External links
 https://web.archive.org/web/20030619004915/http://www.genetunney.org/crossleyfights.html

1901 births
1921 deaths
English male boxers
Deaths from sepsis
Deaths from pneumonia in New York (state)
Heavyweight boxers